This article lists software emulators.

Central processing units

ARM
ARMulator
Aemulor
 QEMU

MIPS
 SPIM: The OVPsim 500 mips MIPS32 emulator, can be used to develop software using virtual platforms, emulators including MIPS processors running at up to 500 MIPS for MIPS32 processors running many OSes including Linux. OVP is used to build emulators of single MIPS processors or multiple - homogeneous MP or heterogenous MP.

x86 architecture
 Bochs
 DOSBox
 FX!32
 PCem
 QEMU – an opensource emulator that emulates 7 architectures including ARM, x86, MIPS, and others
 box86
 Rosetta 2: Apple's emulator for macOS allowing to run x86_64 applications on arm64 platform

Motorola 680x0
 Mac 68K emulator: For PowerPC classic Mac OS

PowerPC
 PearPC
 Rosetta: Apple's emulator for PowerPC processors, built into Mac OS X
 WarpUP: Amiga system for PowerPC expansion cards built into MorphOS and available for AmigaOS
 SheepShaver: Emulates the PowerPC processor. Can run Mac OS 7 to Mac OS 9.

Computer system emulators

Full system simulators

 Simics
 CPU Sim: A Java application that allows the user to design and create a simple architecture and instruction set and then run programs of instructions from the set through simulation
 GXemul: Framework for full-system computer architecture emulation

Mobile phones and PDAs

 Palm OS Emulator
 Adobe Device Central
 BlueStacks
 Blisk (browser)
 touchHLE

Multi-system emulators
 blueMSX: Emulates Z80 based computers and consoles
 MAME: Emulates multiple arcade machines, video game consoles and computers
 DAPHNE is an arcade emulator application that emulates a variety of laserdisc video games with the intent of preserving these games and making the play experience as faithful to the originals as possible. The developer calls DAPHNE the "First Ever Multiple Arcade Laserdisc Emulator" ("FEMALE"). It derives its name from Princess Daphne, the heroine of Dragon's Lair. HYPSEUS is a modern SDL2 update to the DAPHNE emulator, named after a sibling to Daphne.

Network emulators
 ns-2
 Cisco Packet Tracer
 Router Sim

Operating system emulators

Unix
 Cygwin: For Microsoft Windows, provides a POSIX environment and system libraries (contained in cygwin.dll).  This does not allow one to run unaltered Linux/Unix binaries.  However, it allows use of the gcc compiler collection to compile software written for these operating systems from source code.

In addition to the POSIX system, Cygwin includes a package manager that connects to a repository with 9000+ software packages. Users can optionally use Cygwin ports repository which includes >2300 (86x64) to >2700 (86x32) additional software packages not included in the RedHat-hosted repository, including many GUI applications.

The repository contains a wide range of software, including Bash (command shell and scripting environment comparable to the Windows Powershell), the GNU compiler collection with the complete tool chain.  In addition, the 'usual and customary' programming languages installed with a Linux distribution, including C, C++, Python, PHP, Perl, Tcl/Tk, and Lua are available, along with multiple development libraries.

In addition to Bash, the GNU Utilities (e.g. find utilities, such as locate, find, grep) are installed by default.  Hundreds of other software packages are included, many with non-POSIX Windows implementation, such as database management systems (PostgreSQL, MySQL), web servers (e.g. Apache HTTP Server), firewalls, text processing utilities, and console mode applications.  In addition, there is a (reasonably stable) X.org/X11 implementation with GTK and Qt libraries.  Based on these, graphic desktop managers, including GNOME, LXDE, LXQt, KDE, and others (e.g. x2go) with associated graphic user applications with variable stability and functionality.

Windows
 WINE: Available for most POSIX compliant (Unix-like) operating systems, such as Linux, BSD, and macOS (Darling and Darwine projects).  It provides a Win32 API and cleanroom implementation of the associated functionality.  In contrast to Cygwin, WINE enables the installation and use of unaltered Windows software.  Considerable effort has been put into support for video games, including third-party extensions (e.g. PlayOnLinux) which provide custom Windows configurations known to work with a very large list of videogames. In addition, desktop productivity software, including MS Office, is supported.  Because of the lack of dependence on the Windows registry, inclusion of statically linked libraries, and (at least in part) historic development from open source projects, portable application, such as the PortableApps platform and the 300+ available software applications which can be downloaded with it, work with little or no issues.

Printer emulators
 Ghostscript: Emulator for printers without PostScript

Terminal emulators

Video game console emulators

See also
Comparison of application virtual machines
Comparison of OS emulation or virtualization apps on Android
Comparison of platform virtualization software
List of free and open-source emulators for Android
List of video game console emulators

References

 
Emulators